There are around 207,000 Hungarians in Germany. Hungarians have emigrated to Germany since the Middle Ages. However, their number continues to grow at an increased pace since the end of World War I. Today, around 75% of this population live in the states of Bavaria, Baden-Württemberg and Hessen.

Population
Only about 60% arrived with a Hungarian passport, as many of them arrived from areas of the former Kingdom of Hungary (see Treaty of Trianon, 1920).

Major population changes:
About 30,000 arrived after 1945
About 25,000 arrived after the Hungarian Revolution of 1956
25,000 Gastarbeiter from Yugoslavia after 1960
Around 5,000 migrants from Czechoslovakia after the Prague Spring of 1968
Approx. 30,000 Hungarians from Transylvania after 1975
About 15,000 fleeing communism in Hungary
15,000 moving to East Germany (until the 1990 German reunification)

Culture
In 2006/2007, Hungary presented its country and culture in Germany with a whole series of cultural events including the exhibition "Germans in Hungary – Hungarians in Germany. European Lives".

Notable individuals

Albrecht Dürer, painter (his father moved to Germany from Hungary, his surname refers to their old Hungarian village)
Béla Ernyey, actor
Joschka Fischer, politician, foreign minister, his family was expelled from Hungary in 1946
Imre Kertész, writer, recipient of the 2002 Nobel Prize in Literature
Kevin Kurányi, football player (Hungarian on paternal side)
Philipp Lenard, physicist, winner of the Nobel Prize for Physics in 1905
Franz Liszt, composer
Leslie Mándoki, musician
Dzsenifer Marozsán, football player, captain of the Germany women's national football team
Willi Orban - football player
Gabor Steingart, journalist
Niklas Süle, football player
George Tabori, writer
Patrick Buzas, ice hockey player
Béla Réthy, sport reporter
György Grozer, volleyball player
Palkó Dárdai, football player
Matyas Szabo, fencer
Zoltán Sebescen, football player
Nadine Schatzl, handball player
Vera Molnar, actress
Szebasztián Szabó, swimmer

Gallery

See also 
Germany–Hungary relations

References

External links 
 Association of Hungarian Organisations in Germany 
 Collegium Hungaricum Berlin 
 Irány Németország 

Germany
Ethnic groups in Germany
Germany–Hungary relations
20th century in Hungary
Germany